Richard Basil Brandram Jones VC (30 April 1897 – 21 May 1916) was an English recipient of the Victoria Cross, the highest and most prestigious award for gallantry in the face of the enemy that can be awarded to British and Commonwealth forces.

Jones was born on 30 April 1897 in London to Henry Thomas Brandram Jones and Caroline Emma Jones, he was educated at Dulwich College between 1909 and 1914.

He was 19 years old, and a Temporary Lieutenant in the 8th Battalion, The Loyal North Lancashire Regiment, British Army during the First World War when the following deed took place on 21 May 1916 at the Broadmarsh Crater, Vimy, France for which he was awarded the Victoria Cross.

Citation

His Victoria Cross is held at his old school, Dulwich College. The Howard-Jones Challenge Cup for shooting was established in memory of C. C. Howard, killed with the "Loyals" at Vimy Ridge in May 1916 and Richard Jones.

References

 Details
 

1897 births
1916 deaths
People educated at Dulwich College
Loyal Regiment officers
British Army personnel of World War I
British World War I recipients of the Victoria Cross
British military personnel killed in World War I
People from the London Borough of Lewisham
British Army recipients of the Victoria Cross
Military personnel from London